The 2010 Turkish Cup Final took place in Şanlıurfa on May 5, 2010. It was the 48th season of the Turkish Cup.
Trabzonspor won the match 3–1 against Fenerbahçe.

Match details

References

See also
2009–10 Turkish Cup
2009–10 Süper Lig

Turkish Cup finals
Cup
Turkish Cup Final 2010
Turkish Cup Final 2010